Ibafloxacin (INN) is a Fluoroquinolone antibiotic drug formally approved for use in the European Union for veterinary medicine.

References 

Flumequines